|}

The Great Yorkshire Chase is a Premier Handicap National Hunt handicap chase in England which is open to horses aged five years or older. 
It is run at Doncaster over a distance of 3 miles (4,828 metres), and it is scheduled to take place each year in January.

The race was first run in 1948.  It is currently sponsored by Sky Bet and known as the Sky Bet Handicap Chase. The race held Listed status until 2022 and was re-classified as a Premier Handicap from the 2023 running when Listed status was removed from handicap races.

Records
Most successful horse (2 wins):
 Ziga Boy – 2016, 2017

Most successful jockey (3 wins):
 Tim Molony – Arctic Gold (1951), Knock Hard (1953), ESB (1957)

Most successful trainer (4 wins):
 Fred Rimell – Old Morality (1949), ESB (1957), Nicolaus Silver (1962), Rough House (1975)

Winners

See also
List of British National Hunt races
Horseracing in Great Britain

References

Sources
Racing Post

Doncaster Racecourse
National Hunt races in Great Britain
National Hunt chases